Palawan's 2nd congressional district is one of the three congressional districts of the Philippines in the province of Palawan. It has been represented in the House of Representatives since 1987. The district encompasses the southern portion of Palawan Island including the Balabac Island group. It consists of the municipalities of Balabac, Bataraza, Brooke's Point, Narra, Quezon, Rizal and Sofronio Española. Prior to redistricting in 2012, the district also included the capital city Puerto Princesa and the municipality of Aborlan. The district is currently represented in the 19th Congress by Jose Chavez Alvarez of PDP–Laban.

Representation history

Election results

2022

2019

2016

2013

2010

See also 
Legislative districts of Palawan

References

Congressional districts of the Philippines
Politics of Palawan
1987 establishments in the Philippines
Congressional districts of Mimaropa
Constituencies established in 1987